Yurí (Jurí) is, or was, a language previously spoken near a stretch of the Caquetá River in the Brazilian Amazon, extending slightly into Colombia. It was spoken on the Puré River of Colombia, and the Içá River and Japurá River of Brazil.

A small amount of data was collected on two occasions in the 19th century, in 1853 and 1867. Kaufman (1994:62, after Nimuendajú 1977:62) notes that there is good lexical evidence to support a link with Ticuna in a Ticuna–Yurí language family, though the data has never been explicitly compared (Hammarström 2010).

It is commonly assumed that the Yuri people and language survive among the uncontacted people or peoples of the Rio Puré region, now the Río Puré National Park. Indeed, "Yuri" is often used as a synonym for the only named people in the area, the Carabayo. A list of words collected in 1969 from the Carabayo, only recovered in 2013, suggests the language is close to Yuri, though perhaps not a direct descendant.

Vocabulary
Loukotka (1968) lists the following basic vocabulary items.

{| class="wikitable sortable"
! gloss !! Yuri
|-
| one || peyá
|-
| two || goyo-góba
|-
| head || chu-kiriu
|-
| eye || chu-äti
|-
| tooth || cho-öta
|-
| man || choko
|-
| water || koara
|-
| fire || yi
|-
| sun || iyü
|-
| jaguar || wäri
|}

References

Harald Hammarström, 2010, 'The status of the least documented language families in the world'. In Language Documentation & Conservation, v 4, p 183 

Extinct languages of South America
Ticuna–Yuri languages
Languages of Brazil
Languages of Colombia
Languages attested from the 19th century
Languages extinct in the 20th century